Matthew Robert Gage (born February 11, 1993) is an American professional baseball pitcher for the Houston Astros of Major League Baseball (MLB). He has played in MLB for the Toronto Blue Jays.

Amateur career
A native of Johnstown, New York, Gage attended Broadalbin-Perth High School and played college baseball for Siena College. In three seasons with the Saints, Gage pitched to an 11–16 win–loss record, 3.99 earned run average (ERA), and 212 strikeouts in 248 innings. In 2013, he played collegiate summer baseball with the Chatham Anglers of the Cape Cod Baseball League and was named a league all-star.

Professional career

San Francisco Giants
Gage was drafted by the San Francisco Giants in the 10th round of the 2014 Major League Baseball draft. He was assigned to the Rookie-level Arizona League Giants for the remainder of the 2014 season, appearing in 13 games and posting a 2–0 record, 1.89 ERA, and 32 strikeouts. Gage began the 2015 season with the Class-A Augusta GreenJackets, and was later promoted to the Double-A Richmond Flying Squirrels. In total, Gage went 6–7 with a 4.27 ERA and 101 strikeouts in 116 total innings. He played the entire 2016 season with Richmond, making 23 starts and posting a 9–7 record, 3.38 ERA, and 106 strikeouts in 136 innings. Gage made his Triple-A debut in 2017, appearing in games for Richmond and the Sacramento River Cats. In a career-high 145 innings, he went 6–11 with a 4.21 ERA and 95 strikeouts, and was named a mid-season All-Star for Richmond.

New York Mets
Gage began the 2018 season with Richmond, and made appearances in Sacramento, but struggled to a 6.45 ERA. He was released by the Giants organization on July 13, and signed with the New York Mets organization on August 4. He was assigned to the Double-A Binghamton Rumble Ponies, and also appeared for the Triple-A Las Vegas 51s. In total for 2018, Gage played 20 games and posted a 7–11 win–loss record, 5.16 ERA, and 80 strikeouts in 103 innings.

Diablos Rojos del Mexico
Gage elected free agency in the offseason, and signed with the Diablos Rojos del México of the Mexican League for the 2019 season. In 118 total innings, Gage went 10–4 with a 5.57 ERA and 106 strikeouts. Due to the COVID-19 pandemic's cancellation of the 2020 minor league season, Gage played independent baseball with the Eastern Reyes del Tigre of the Constellation Energy League.

Arizona Diamondbacks
In the offseason Gage played for the Venados de Mazatlán of the Mexican Pacific Winter League, and on February 9, 2021, signed with the Arizona Diamondbacks organization. Now pitching exclusively as a reliever, Gage appeared in 43 games split between the Double-A Amarillo Sod Poodles and Triple-A Reno Aces. He posted a combined 4–1 record, 4.14 ERA, and 58 strikeouts in 45 innings.

Toronto Blue Jays
After returning to the Venados in the offseason, Gage signed a minor league contract with the Toronto Blue Jays on November 29, 2021, and was invited to spring training. He began the season with the Triple-A Buffalo Bisons, where he went 1–2 with a 1.08 ERA in 16 innings before being called-up.

Gage was promoted to the majors for the first time on June 6, 2022, and made his debut that night with a scoreless inning of relief against the Kansas City Royals. Gage made 11 total appearances for Toronto in his rookie campaign, logging a stellar 1.38 ERA with 12 strikeouts in 13.0 innings of work.

On January 31, 2023, Gage was designated for assignment by the Blue Jays after the signing of Chad Green was made official. On February 6, Gage placed on release waivers by the Blue Jays.

Houston Astros
On February 13, 2023, Gage was claimed off waivers by the Houston Astros.

References

External links

1993 births
Living people
People from Johnstown, New York
Baseball players from New York (state)
Major League Baseball pitchers
Toronto Blue Jays players
Siena Saints baseball players
Chatham Anglers players
Arizona League Giants players
Augusta GreenJackets players
Richmond Flying Squirrels players
Sacramento River Cats players
Las Vegas 51s players
Binghamton Rumble Ponies players
Sugar Land Skeeters players
Eastern Reyes del Tigre players
Venados de Mazatlán players
Amarillo Sod Poodles players
Reno Aces players
Buffalo Bisons (minor league) players